Dibenz[a,j]anthracene is an organic compound with the chemical formula C22H14.

In February 2014, NASA announced a greatly upgraded database for tracking polycyclic aromatic hydrocarbons (PAHs), including dibenz[a,j]anthracene, in the universe. According to scientists, more than 20% of the carbon in the universe may be associated with PAHs, possible starting materials for the formation of life. PAHs seem to have been formed shortly after the Big Bang, are widespread throughout the universe, and are associated with new stars and exoplanets.

References

Polycyclic aromatic hydrocarbons
IARC Group 3 carcinogens